

2014 FIVB Volleyball World League 

|}

2014 Memorial of Hubert Jerzy Wagner 

|}

2014 FIVB Volleyball Men's World Championship 

|}

2014–15 EuroLeague Women 

Tauron Arena Kraków
Poland sport-related lists
Tauron Arena Krakow
Sports events in Tauron Arena Krakow